New Zealand has competed in all of the Commonwealth Games since the first in 1930, and has won a total of 656 medals including 159 gold.

The New Zealand Olympic Committee (known as The New Zealand Olympic and Commonwealth Games Association prior to 1994) is the body in New Zealand responsible for selecting Athletes to represent New Zealand at the Commonwealth Games. The NZOC is a member of the Commonwealth Games Federation.

In 1978, Nigeria boycotted the Commonwealth Games in protest at New Zealand's continued relations, including sporting contacts, with apartheid-era South Africa.

Host nation
New Zealand has hosted the Games three times:
1950 British Empire Games – Auckland 
1974 British Commonwealth Games – Christchurch
1990 Commonwealth Games – Auckland

Medals

Historically, New Zealand has generally been 4th or 5th, though was up to 3rd (1950 & 1962), and down to 11th (1970 & 2010) and 9th (2006). At the first games in 1930, New Zealand's 4th position was ahead of Australia at 5th. At the conclusion of the 2014 Commonwealth Games, New Zealand has earned 159 gold medals, 220 silver medals and 278 bronze medals. In the all-time medal tally New Zealand is ranked 5th behind Australia, England, Canada and India.

By sport
Events in bold featured at the 2018 Commonwealth Games.

Competitors
Notable competitors for New Zealand include Greg Yelavich in sports shooting, who has won 12 medals at 6 games from 1986 to 2010. Rowan Brassey has also competed at 6 games, and has won 3 medals in lawn bowls. Gary Anderson won 3 golds, 2 silvers and 3 bronze medals for New Zealand in cycling. Athlete Valerie Young has won the most gold medals (5) of any New Zealand competitor.

References

External links
New Zealand at the Commonwealth Games 
Athletics in the 1966 Encyclopaedia of New Zealand has a paragraph on each Olympiad and Empire Games to 1964

 
Nations at the Commonwealth Games